Neuris Delgado Ramírez (born October 1981) is a Cuban-Paraguayan chess player who received the FIDE  title of Grandmaster in 2002.

He played for Cuba at the Chess Olympiad in 2002, 2004 and 2006. Since 2014, Delgado Ramírez has represented Paraguay in this competition.

He competed in the FIDE World Cup in 2017 and 2019. Delgado Ramírez was knocked out in the first round on both occasions, after losing to Vidit Santosh Gujrathi and Luke McShane respectively.

References

External links
 
 
 
 

1981 births
Living people
Cuban chess players
Paraguayan chess players
Chess grandmasters
Date of birth missing (living people)